William Graves may refer to:
 William Graves (judge) (born 1936), Associate Justice of the Kentucky Supreme Court
 William Graves (MP) (1724–1801), who sat for East Looe and West Looe in the British Parliament
 William Carey Graves (1895–1966), Texas State Senator
 William J. Graves (1805–1848), U.S. Representative from Kentucky
 William P. Graves, former North Carolina football coach
 William S. Graves (1865–1940), U.S. general and commander of the Siberia expedition
 Will Graves, basketball player
 Bill Graves (born 1953), Governor of Kansas

See also
William Graves Sharp (1859–1922), U.S. lawyer, congressman and diplomat
William Greaves (disambiguation)